Fernand Bosmans (29 June 1883 – 30 July 1960) was a Belgian fencer. He won a bronze medal in the team épée event at the 1908 Summer Olympics.

References

1883 births
1960 deaths
Belgian male fencers
Belgian épée fencers
Olympic fencers of Belgium
Fencers at the 1908 Summer Olympics
Olympic bronze medalists for Belgium
Sportspeople from Antwerp
Medalists at the 1908 Summer Olympics
Olympic medalists in fencing
20th-century Belgian people